Alvin High School is a public high school located in the city of Alvin, Texas, United States and classified as a 6A school by the University Interscholastic League (UIL). It is a part of the Alvin Independent School District located in central Brazoria County. In 2015, the school was rated "Met Standard" by the Texas Education Agency.

History 
Alvin High School opened in 1894, with its first graduating class graduating in 1897. Alvin High School gained more residents as many school districts consolidated into Alvin ISD. and remained Alvin ISD's only high school until Manvel High School opened in fall 2006 with 9th and 10th grades, phasing in 11th and 12th grades in the following two years.

After the annexation of several school districts, ending with the Manvel Independent School District in 1973, Alvin High School as the sole high school in Alvin ISD. It served the city of Manvel, the town of Iowa Colony, portions of the city of Pearland (including the Brazoria County portion of Shadow Creek Ranch), and additional portions of unincorporated Brazoria County (including areas around Rosharon) until the opening of Manvel High School in 2006.

Communities served by Alvin High School 
Alvin High School serves the cities of Alvin, Hillcrest, and Liverpool, as well as unincorporated portions of Brazoria County (including Amsterdam).

Extracurricular Activities

Athletics
The Alvin Yellowjackets compete in these sports - 

Baseball
Basketball
Cross Country
Football
Golf
Gymnastics
Powerlifting
Soccer
Softball
Swimming and Diving
Tennis
Track and Field
Volleyball
Water Polo

Academics and Arts
Academic Decathlon
Choir
Concert Band and Marching Band
Theatre
UIL Academics
Debate
Literary Criticism
Mathematics
One-Act Plays

State Titles
Softball 
2008(5A)
Boys Track 
1925(B)
United Academic Decathlon
2013
2016
2017

State Finalist
Baseball 
1965(3A)

Notable alumni 
 Nathan Eovaldi (class of 2008), MLB pitcher (2011–present), 2018 World Series Champion
 Savion Flagg (class of 2017), professional basketball player
 George Layne (class of 1998), NFL running back (2001–2004)
 Austin Miller (class of 1994), actor, singer and dancer
 Gunner Olszewski (class of 2015), NFL wide receiver (2019–present)
 Nolan Ryan (class of 1965), MLB pitcher (1966–1993), held Alvin High School strikeout record for 44 years
 Reid Ryan (class of 1990), former minor league baseball pitcher, former President of Business Operations for the Houston Astros organization

References

External links 

 
School Map
 Alvin High School Baseball
 Alvin High School Bowling Team

Alvin Independent School District high schools
Educational institutions established in 1894
1894 establishments in Texas